Diego Fortunato dos Santos Queiroz (born 14 January 1984), known as Diego Galo, is a Brazilian professional footballer who plays for Portuguese club União Leiria.

Career
In June 2015, Galo left the Arouquenses for newly promoted União da Madeira.

On 11 July 2019, he signed a one-year contract with Portuguese club Chaves.

Honours
Tondela
Terceira Divisão: 2008–09

Moreirense
Taça da Liga: 2016–17

Desportivo das Aves
Taça de Portugal: 2017–18

References

External links
 
 

1984 births
Living people
Footballers from São Paulo (state)
Brazilian footballers
Brazilian expatriate footballers
Association football defenders
Segunda Divisão players
Liga Portugal 2 players
U.D. Oliveirense players
Primeira Liga players
F.C. Arouca players
C.F. União players
Moreirense F.C. players
C.D. Aves players
G.D. Chaves players
U.D. Leiria players
Expatriate footballers in Portugal
Brazilian expatriate sportspeople in Portugal
People from Diadema